Joseph Jerome Jefferson, Jr. (born February 15, 1980) is a former American football cornerback in the National Football League. He was drafted in the third round of the 2002 NFL Draft. Before playing for the NFL, Jefferson was a standout football and basketball player at Logan County High School in Russellville, Kentucky. He was hampered by injuries his entire NFL career. The most games he ever played in a season was 10, including two postseason appearances, in 2004. Injuries made him miss the entire 2003 season. Jefferson had 49 career tackles (38 solo, 11 assisted) and one interception. He also had one career kick return, which he returned 11 yards.

References

External links
NFL.com player page

1980 births
Living people
People from Russellville, Kentucky
Players of American football from Kentucky
American football cornerbacks
Western Kentucky Hilltoppers football players
Indianapolis Colts players